Zoetrope is an album released in 2002 by the dark ambient musician Lustmord on the Nextera record label. The album is the expanded soundtrack to the 1999 experimental psychological horror film of the same name, directed by Charlie Deaux.

Track listing 
 Main Title/Infinite Space - 7:17
 The Cell - 5:49
 Cellular Blur - 4:31
 Descent - 5:03
 Transitional Pathway - 5:25
 Amalgamated Man - 8:02
 The Harrow - 7:26
 Disintegration - 3:48
 End Titles - 4:58
 Zoetrope Trailer v.3 - 3:28

Credits 

Artwork-Tracey Roberts
Mastered by-Karel Kourek
Performer/producer-Brian Williams

References

External links 

Lustmord albums
2002 soundtrack albums